The Gunners may refer to:

Arsenal F.C., an English association football club
The Royal Artillery, a British Army regiment

See also
Gunner (disambiguation)